Neogene intermedia is a moth of the  family Sphingidae. It is known from Paraguay.

The length of the forewings is about 28 mm. It is intermediate between Neogene reevei and Neogene pictus. The thorax and abdomen uppersides are black. The forewing upperside is almost as dark as in Neogene pictus and much darker than in Neogene reevi. The median area is lighter than the basal area. The forewing underside is similar to that of Neogene reevi, but the distal marginal band is much darker and the hindwing upper- and underside pattern is also similar to that of Neogene reevi, but the distal marginal band is black as in Neogene pictus.

References

Neogene (moth)
Moths described in 1935